Scandal on Park Street is a 1932 German film directed by Franz Wenzler and starring Camilla Spira, Fritz Kampers, and Kurt Lilien. It was shot at the Johannisthal Studios in Berlin. The film's sets were designed by the art director Ernő Metzner.

Cast

References

Bibliography 
 
 Klaus, Ulrich J. Deutsche Tonfilme: Jahrgang 1932. Klaus-Archiv, 1988.

External links 
 

1932 films
Films of the Weimar Republic
1930s German-language films
Films directed by Franz Wenzler
Films scored by Bronisław Kaper
German black-and-white films
1930s German films
Films shot at Johannisthal Studios